Modell's Sporting Goods is an American online sporting goods retailer that had locations in the Northeastern United States. Modell's carries both sporting goods and related apparel. Modell's had more than 150 retail locations in ten states and the District of Columbia in 2018. The company reported revenue of approximately $765 million in 2015. Sales in 2019 were $538 million, 96%/4% split between retail/online. Its slogan was "Gotta Go To Mo's."

Modell’s filed for bankruptcy protection in 2020 and the company eventually resorted to liquidating its remaining 134 store locations. In August 2020, Modell’s was relaunched as an online retailer by a company called Retail Ecommerce Ventures, which bought the rights to several other retail brands that were recently disestablished.

History

The chain was founded as a single store by Morris A. Modell in 1889 in Manhattan, making it possibly the third oldest sporting goods store in North America (after James F. Brine's in Massachusetts and Milwaukee's Burghardt Sporting Goods). Modell, a Jewish immigrant from Hungary, opened the first location on Cortlandt Street in Lower Manhattan (the Modell pawn shop chain in Manhattan and Brooklyn was founded by Morris's brother George in 1893 as a spinoff. The two companies operate separately).

Through the years, it has remained a family-owned business, passing through four generations of the Modell family. While best known as a sporting goods retailer, Modell's also operated a chain of "full-line" discount retailers in the New York-metro area known as "Modell's Shopper's World" (and for a short time as "White-Modells") from the mid-1950s up until 1989, when the company decided to focus on its sporting goods operations partly due to increased competition in the discount retail market.

William Modell, who became chairman in 1985, also founded the Crohn's and Colitis Foundation along with his wife, Shelby Modell.

Modell's operated 152 stores at its peak mainly in New York, New Jersey, and Pennsylvania. In recent years, the chain expanded to Delaware, Maryland, Virginia, the District of Columbia as well as Connecticut, Massachusetts, and New Hampshire.  Their flagship store was at 234 West 42nd Street near Times Square.

CEO Mitchell Modell was featured on an episode of Undercover Boss that aired on November 2, 2012 in which he went in disguise into his own stores to see things from an employee point of view. Two years later, he was accused in a February 2014 lawsuit by rival Dick's Sporting Goods of entering a Dick's store in disguise to gain access to their retail secrets. The lawsuit was quickly settled out of court for undisclosed terms by April. Independent retail analysts and attorneys suggested that Modell visited the store on a whim, rather than as part of some plot to steal information.

In the early 21st century, Modell's faced declining sales which Mitchell Modell has blamed on increased competition, poor performance by professional sports teams, and increased temperatures caused by climate change. In May 2019, Modell lent the company $6.7 million to avoid bankruptcy; in February 2020 the company announced that it intended to close 24 stores. However, in March 2020, the company filed for Chapter 11 bankruptcy and announced that it would liquidate its 134 remaining stores, with Tiger Capital being appointed as the liquidator. The liquidation began on March 13, 2020. All their stores were closed by the end of August 2020.

Hilco Streambank announced that on August 4, 2020, it would auction Modell's intellectual property, including customer data and the marketing jingle. Hilco Streambank also placed the stalking horse bid at $1.965 million. Modell's was acquired by Retail Ecommerce Ventures (REV), a holding company founded by Alex Mehr and Tai Lopez, for $3.64 million. The acquisition, finalized on August 14, 2020, includes the brand name, trademarks, domain name, and the "Gotta Go To Mo's" jingle.   The Modell's website relaunched in 2020.

On March 2, 2023, Retail Ecommerce Ventures, Modell's current parent, announced that it was mulling a possible bankruptcy filing.

Local sports affiliations
Modell's had local specialized offerings and programs such as Team Weeks, which assists local schools, leagues, and non-profit organizations. Modell's sponsored many professional sports teams in their U.S. East Coast market area, including the Baltimore Orioles, Baltimore Ravens, Boston Bruins, Boston Celtics, Brooklyn Nets, New York Mets, New York Yankees, New York Giants, New York Jets, New York Knicks, New York Rangers, New York Islanders, New Jersey Devils, Philadelphia Phillies, Philadelphia Eagles, Philadelphia 76ers, Philadelphia Flyers, Washington Capitals, Washington Nationals, as well as numerous minor league baseball teams.

Some writers attributed at least some of Modell's problems during the 2010s due to the poor performance of New York sports teams in that decade, and the difficulty in selling their merchandise.

Art Modell, who owned the NFL football teams Cleveland Browns and then Baltimore Ravens, was the grandson of the founder of Modell's Sporting Goods, Morris A. Modell, but had nothing to do with that company. A perceived affiliation was hoped to be useful when Modell Sporting Goods attempted to penetrate Maryland markets in 2004 — a spokesman stated, "I think that Art Modell having brought a team to Baltimore that won a Super Bowl championship can help in some ways" — but the expansion was ultimately not successful.

References

External links
Official site

Shops in New York City
Economy of the Northeastern United States
Sporting goods retailers of the United States
Online retailers of the United States
1889 establishments in New York (state)
2020 disestablishments in New York (state)
American companies established in 1889
American companies disestablished in 2020
Retail companies established in 1889
Retail companies disestablished in 2020
Companies based in Manhattan
Companies that filed for Chapter 11 bankruptcy in 2020